Carolyn L. Bridges (born August 18, 1946) is an American politician who served in the Kansas House of Representatives as a Democrat from the 83rd district from 2013 until the end of 2015. 

Bridges was originally elected in the November 2012 elections, where she defeated Republican Tim Garvey 58% to 42%.  She was re-elected in 2014 by a similar margin, but resigned her seat on December 20, 2015. Henry Helgerson was appointed to replace her.

References

Living people
1946 births
Democratic Party members of the Kansas House of Representatives
Women state legislators in Kansas
21st-century American women politicians
21st-century American politicians
Politicians from Wichita, Kansas